Getter is an Estonian feminine given name and may refer to:
Getter Jaani (born 1993), Estonian singer
Getter Laar (born 1989), Estonian footballer
Getter Saar (badminton) (born 1992), Estonian badminton player
Getter Saar (born 1999), Estonian footballer

References

Estonian feminine given names